Zoran Ivančić (born 16 September 1975) is a Croatian retired football defender who last played for Mladost Prelog in Croatia’s Treća HNL.

Club career
During his professional career he mainly played for NK Varteks (renamed NK Varaždin in mid-2010) in Croatia’s Prva HNL, with two stints in Austria and Slovenia.

Managerial career
He resigned as manager of Međimurje in September 2022 due to personal reasons. He had only be in charge for three weeks after succeeding Ivica Solomun in the hot seat.

References

External links
 Austrian career stats - ÖFB

1975 births
Living people
People from Varaždin County
Association football defenders
Croatian footballers
NK Varaždin players
FC Kärnten players
Kapfenberger SV players
NK Pomorac 1921 players
NK Dravograd players
HNK Rijeka players
NK Čakovec players
Croatian Football League players
2. Liga (Austria) players
Second Football League (Croatia) players
Croatian expatriate footballers
Expatriate footballers in Austria
Croatian expatriate sportspeople in Austria
Expatriate footballers in Slovenia
Croatian expatriate sportspeople in Slovenia
Croatian football managers
NK Međimurje managers